Doha (  or ad-Dōḥa) is the capital city and main financial hub of Qatar. Located on the Persian Gulf coast in the east of the country, north of Al Wakrah and south of Al Khor, it is home to most of the country's population. It is also Qatar's fastest growing city, with over 80% of the nation's population living in Doha or its surrounding suburbs. 

Doha was founded in the 1820s as an offshoot of Al Bidda. It was officially declared as the country's capital in 1971, when Qatar gained independence from being a British protectorate. As the commercial capital of Qatar and one of the emergent financial centers in the Middle East, Doha is considered a beta-level global city by the Globalization and World Cities Research Network. Doha accommodates Education City, an area devoted to research and education, and Hamad Medical City, an administrative area of medical care. It also includes Doha Sports City, or Aspire Zone, an international sports destination that includes Khalifa International Stadium, Hamad Aquatic Centre; and the Aspire Dome.

The city was host to the first ministerial-level meeting of the Doha Development Round of World Trade Organization negotiations. It was also selected as host city of a number of sporting events, including the 2006 Asian Games, the 2011 Pan Arab Games, the 2019 World Beach Games, the FINA World Aquatics Championships, the FIVB Volleyball Club World Championship, the WTA Finals and most of the games at the 2011 AFC Asian Cup. In December 2011, the World Petroleum Council held the 20th World Petroleum Conference in Doha. Additionally, the city hosted the 2012 UNFCCC Climate Negotiations and the 2022 FIFA World Cup.

The city also hosted the 140th Inter-Parliamentary Union Assembly in April 2019 and hosted 18th yearly session United Nations Framework Convention on Climate Change in 2012.

Etymology
According to the Ministry of Municipality and Environment, the name "Doha" originated from the Arabic term dohat, meaning "roundness"—a reference to the rounded bays surrounding the area's coastline.

History

Establishment of Al Bidda
The city of Doha was formed seceding from another local settlement known as Al Bidda. The earliest documented mention of Al Bidda was made in 1681 by the Carmelite Convent, in an account which chronicles several settlements in Qatar. In the record, the ruler and a fort in the confines of Al Bidda are alluded to. Carsten Niebuhr, a German explorer who visited the Arabian Peninsula, created one of the first maps to depict the settlement in 1765 in which he labelled it as 'Guttur'.

David Seaton, a British political resident in Muscat, wrote the first English record of Al Bidda in 1801. He refers to the town as 'Bedih' and describes the geography and defensive structures in the area. He stated that the town had recently been settled by the Sudan tribe (singular Al-Suwaidi), whom he considered to be pirates. Seaton attempted to bombard the town with his warship, but returned to Muscat upon finding that the waters were too shallow to position his warship within striking distance.

In 1820, British surveyor R. H. Colebrook, who visited Al Bidda, remarked on the recent depopulation of the town. He wrote:

The same year, an agreement known as the General Maritime Treaty was signed between the East India Company and the sheikhs of several Persian Gulf settlements (some of which were later known as the Trucial Coast). It acknowledged British authority in the Persian Gulf and sought to end piracy and the slave trade. Bahrain became a party to the treaty, and it was assumed that Qatar, perceived as a dependency of Bahrain by the British, was also a party to it. Qatar, however, was not asked to fly the prescribed Trucial flag. As punishment for alleged piracy committed by the inhabitants of Al Bidda and breach of the treaty, an East India Company vessel bombarded the town in 1821. They razed the town, forcing between 300 and 400 natives to flee and temporarily take shelter on the islands between Qatar and the Trucial Coast.

Formation of Doha
Doha was founded in the vicinity of Al Bidda sometime during the 1820s. In January 1823, political resident John MacLeod visited Al Bidda to meet with the ruler and initial founder of Doha, Buhur bin Jubrun, who was also the chief of the Al-Buainain tribe. MacLeod noted that Al Bidda was the only substantial trading port in the peninsula during this time. Following the founding of Doha, written records often conflated Al Bidda and Doha due to the extremely close proximity of the two settlements. Later that year, Lt. Guy and Lt. Brucks mapped and wrote a description of the two settlements. Despite being mapped as two separate entities, they were referred to under the collective name of Al Bidda in the written description.

In 1828, Mohammed bin Khamis, a prominent member of the Al-Buainain tribe and successor of Buhur bin Jubrun as chief of Al Bidda, was embroiled in controversy. He had murdered a native of Bahrain, prompting the Al Khalifa sheikh to imprison him. In response, the Al-Buainain tribe revolted, provoking the Al Khalifa to destroy the tribe's fort and evict them to Fuwayrit and Ar Ru'ays. This incident allowed the Al Khalifa additional jurisdiction over the town. With essentially no effective ruler, Al Bidda and Doha became a sanctuary for pirates and outlaws.

In November 1839, an outlaw from Abu Dhabi named Ghuleta took refuge in Al Bidda, evoking a harsh response from the British. A. H. Nott, a British naval commander, demanded that Salemin bin Nasir Al-Suwaidi, chief of the Sudan tribe (Suwaidi) in Al Bidda, take Ghuleta into custody and warned him of consequences in the case of non-compliance. Al-Suwaidi obliged the British request in February 1840 and also arrested the pirate Jasim bin Jabir and his associates. Despite the compliance, the British demanded a fine of 300 German krones in compensation for the damages incurred by pirates off the coast of Al Bidda; namely for the piracies committed by bin Jabir. In February 1841, British naval squadrons arrived in Al Bidda and ordered Al-Suwaidi to meet the British demand, threatening consequences if he declined. Al-Suwaidi ultimately declined on the basis that he was uninvolved in bin Jabir's actions. On 26 February, the British fired on Al Bidda, striking a fort and several houses. Al-Suwaidi then paid the fine in full following threats of further action by the British.

Isa bin Tarif, a powerful tribal chief from the Al Bin Ali tribe, moved to Doha in May 1843. He subsequently evicted the ruling Sudan tribe and installed the Al-Maadeed and Al-Kuwari tribes in positions of power. Bin Tarif had been loyal to the Al Khalifa, however, shortly after the swearing-in of a new ruler in Bahrain, bin Tarif grew increasingly suspicious of the ruling Al Khalifa and switched his allegiance to the deposed ruler of Bahrain, Abdullah bin Khalifa, whom he had previously assisted in deposing of. Bin Tarif died in the Battle of Fuwayrit against the ruling family of Bahrain in 1847.

Arrival of the House of Al Thani
The Al Thani family migrated to Doha from Fuwayrit shortly after Bin Tarif's death in 1847 under the leadership of Mohammed bin Thani. In the proceeding years, the Al Thani family assumed control of the town. At various times, they swapped allegiances between the two prevailing powers in the area: the Al Khalifa of Bahrain and the Bin Saudis.

In 1867, many ships and troops were sent from Bahrain to assault the towns Al Wakrah and Doha over a series of disputes. Abu Dhabi joined on Bahrain's behalf due to the perception that Al Wakrah served as a refuge for fugitives from Oman. Later that year, the combined forces sacked the two Qatari towns with around 2,700 men in what would come to be known as the Qatari–Bahraini War. A British record later stated "that the towns of Doha and Wakrah were, at the end of 1867 temporarily blotted out of existence, the houses being dismantled and the inhabitants deported".

The joint Bahraini-Abu Dhabi incursion and subsequent Qatari counterattack prompted the British political agent, Colonel Lewis Pelly, to impose a settlement in 1868. Pelly's mission to Bahrain and Qatar and the peace treaty that resulted were milestones in Qatar's history. It implicitly recognized Qatar as a distinct entity independent from Bahrain and explicitly acknowledged the position of Mohammed bin Thani as an important representative of the peninsula's tribes.

In December 1871, the Ottomans established a presence in the country with 100 of their troops occupying the Musallam fort in Doha. This was accepted by Mohammad bin Thani's son, Jassim Al Thani, who wished to protect Doha from Saudi incursions. The Ottoman commander, Major Ömer Bey, compiled a report on Al Bidda in January 1872, stating that it was an "administrative centre" with around 1,000 houses and 4,000 inhabitants.

Disagreement over tribute and interference in internal affairs arose, eventually leading to the Battle of Al Wajbah in March 1893. Al Bidda fort served as the final point of retreat for Ottoman troops. While they were garrisoned in the fort, their corvette fired indiscriminately at the townspeople, killing a number of civilians. The Ottomans eventually surrendered after Jassim Al Thani's troops cut off the town's water supply. An Ottoman report compiled the same year reported that Al Bidda and Doha had a combined population of 6,000 inhabitants, jointly referring to both towns by the name of 'Katar'. Doha was classified as the eastern section of Katar. The Ottomans held a passive role in Qatar's politics from the 1890s onward until fully relinquishing control during the beginning of the first World War.

20th century

Pearling had come to play a pivotal commercial role in Doha by the 20th century. The population increased to around 12,000 inhabitants in the first half of the 20th century due to the flourishing pearl trade. A British political resident noted that should the supply of pearls drop, Qatar would 'practically cease to exist'. In 1907, the city accommodated 350 pearling boats with a combined crew size of 6,300 men. By this time, the average prices of pearls had more than doubled since 1877. The pearl market collapsed that year, forcing Jassim Al Thani to sell the country's pearl harvest at half its value. The aftermath of the collapse resulted in the establishment of the country's first custom house in Doha.

Lorimer report (1908)
British administrator and historian J. G. Lorimer authored an extensive handbook for British agents in the Persian Gulf entitled Gazetteer of the Persian Gulf in 1908. In it, he gives a comprehensive account of Doha at the time:

Lorimer goes on to list and describe the districts of Doha, which at the time included the still-existing districts of Al Mirqab, As Salatah, Al Bidda and Rumeilah. Remarking on Doha's appearance, he states:

As for Doha's population, Lorimer asserts that "the inhabitants of Dohah are estimated to amount, inclusive of the Turkish military garrison of 350 men, to about 12,000 souls". He qualified this statement with a tabulated overview of the various tribes and ethnic groups living in the town.

British protectorate (1916–1971)
In April 1913, the Ottomans agreed to a British request that they withdraw all their troops from Qatar. Ottoman presence in the peninsula ceased, when in August 1915, the Ottoman fort in Al Bidda was evacuated shortly after the start of World War I. One year later, Qatar agreed to be a British protectorate with Doha as its official capital.

Buildings at the time were simple dwellings of one or two rooms, built from mud, stone and coral. Oil concessions in the 1920s and 1930s, and subsequent oil drilling in 1939, heralded the beginning of slow economic and social progress in the country. However, revenues were somewhat diminished due to the devaluation of pearl trade in the Persian Gulf brought on by the introduction of the cultured pearl and the Great Depression. The collapse of the pearl trade caused a significant population drop throughout the entire country. It was not until the 1950s and 1960s that the country saw significant monetary returns from oil drilling.

Qatar was not long in exploiting the new-found wealth from oil concessions, and slum areas were quickly razed to be replaced by more modern buildings. The first formal boys' school was established in Doha in 1952, followed three years later by the establishment of a girls' school. Historically, Doha had been a commercial port of local significance. However, the shallow water of the bay prevented bigger ships from entering the port until the 1970s, when its deep-water port was completed. Further changes followed with extensive land reclamation, which led to the development of the crescent-shaped bay. From the 1950s to 1970s, the population of Doha grew from around 14,000 inhabitants to over 83,000, with foreign immigrants constituting about two-thirds of the overall population.

Post-independence

Qatar officially declared its independence in 1971, with Doha as its capital city. In 1973, the University of Qatar was opened by emiri decree, and in 1975 the Qatar National Museum opened in what was originally the ruler's palace. During the 1970s, all old neighborhoods in Doha were razed and the inhabitants moved to new suburban developments, such as Al Rayyan, Madinat Khalifa and Al Gharafa. The metropolitan area's population grew from 89,000 in the 1970s to over 434,000 in 1997. Additionally, land policies resulted in the total land area increasing to over 7,100 hectares (about 17,000 acres) by 1995, an increase from 130 hectares in the middle of the 20th century.

In 1983, a hotel and conference center was developed at the north end of the Corniche. The 15-storey Sheraton hotel structure in this center would serve as the tallest structure in Doha until the 1990s. In 1993, the Qatar Open became the first major sports event to be hosted in the city. Two years later, Qatar stepped in to host the FIFA World Youth Championship, with all the matches being played in Doha-based stadiums.

The Al Jazeera Arabic news channel began broadcasting from Doha in 1996. In the late 1990s, the government planned the construction of Education City, a 2,500 hectare Doha-based complex mainly for educational institutes. Since the start of the 21st century, Doha attained significant media attention due to the hosting of several global events and the inauguration of a number of architectural mega-projects. One of the largest projects launched by the government was The Pearl-Qatar, an artificial island off the coast of West Bay, which launched its first district in 2004. In 2006, Doha was selected to host the Asian Games, leading to the development of a 250-hectare sporting complex known as Aspire Zone. During this time, new cultural attractions were constructed in the city, with older ones being restored. In 2006, the government launched a restoration program to preserve Souq Waqif's architectural and historical identity. Parts constructed after the 1950s were demolished whereas older structures were refurbished. The restoration was completed in 2008. Katara Cultural Village was opened in the city in 2010 and has hosted the Doha Tribeca Film Festival since then.

The main outcome of the World Trade Organization Ministerial Conference of 2013 was the Trade Facilitation Agreement.  The agreement aims to make it easier and cheaper to import and export by improving customs procedures and making rules more transparent.  Reducing global trade costs by 1% would increase worldwide income by more than USD 40 billion, 65% of which would go to developing countries.  The gains from the Trade Facilitation Agreement are expected to be distributed among all countries and regions, with developing landlocked countries benefiting the most.

The Trade Facilitation Agreement will enter into force upon its ratification by 2/3 of WTO Members. The EU ratified the agreement in October 2015.

In Bali, WTO members also agreed on a series of Doha agriculture and development issues.
Now modernizing city while preserving traditions is part of the country’s long-term plan, Qatar National Vision 2030.

Geography

Doha is located on the central-east portion of Qatar, bordered by the Persian Gulf on its coast. Doha is highly urbanized. Land reclamation off the coast has added 400 hectares of land and 30 km of coastline. Half of the 22 km² of surface area which Hamad International Airport was constructed on was reclaimed land. The geology of Doha is primarily composed of weathered unconformity on the top of the Eocene period Dammam Formation, forming dolomitic limestone.

The Pearl is an artificial island in Doha with a surface area of nearly  The total project has been estimated to cost $15 billion upon completion. Other islands off Doha's coast include Palm Tree Island, Shrao's Island, Al Safliya Island, and Alia Island.

Furthermore, the waters had an average pH of 7.83, a salinity of 49.0 psu, an average temperature of 22.7 °C and 5.5 mg/L of dissolved oxygen.

Climate
Doha has a hot desert climate (Köppen climate classification BWh) with long, extremely hot summers and short, mild to warm winters. The average high temperatures between May and September surpass  and often approach . Humidity is usually the lowest in May and June. Dewpoints can surpass  in the summer. Throughout the summer, the city averages almost no precipitation, and less than  during other months. The winter's days are relativity warm while the sun is up and cool during the night. The temperature rarely drops below .

Demographics

A significant portion of Qatar's population lives within Doha and its metropolitan area. The district with the highest population density is the central area of Al Najada, which also accommodates the highest total population in the country. The population density across the greater Doha region ranges from 20,000 people per km² to 25-50 people per km². Doha witnessed explosive growth rates in population in the first decade of the 21st century, absorbing the majority of the thousands of people then immigrating to Qatar every month. Doha's population is around one million, with the population of the city more than doubling from 2000 to 2010.

Ethnicity and languages
The population of Doha is overwhelmingly composed of expatriates, with Qatari nationals forming a minority. The largest portion of expatriates in Qatar are from South-East and South Asian countries, mainly India, Pakistan, Sri Lanka, Nepal, Philippines, and Bangladesh with large numbers of expatriates also coming from the Levant Arab countries, Djibouti, Somalia, North Africa, and East Asia. Doha is also home to many expatriates from Europe, North America, South Africa and Australia.

Arabic is the official language of Qatar. English is commonly used as a second language, and a rising lingua franca, especially in commerce. As there is a large expatriate population in Doha, languages such as Malayalam, Tamil, Bengali, Tagalog, Spanish, Sinhala, French, Urdu and Hindi are widely spoken.

In 2004, the Foreign Ownership of Real Estate Law was passed, permitting non-Qatari citizens to buy land in designated areas of Doha, including the West Bay Lagoon, the Qatar Pearl, and the new Lusail City. Prior to this, expatriates were prohibited from owning land in Qatar. Ownership by foreigners in Qatar entitles them to a renewable residency permit, which allows them to live and work in Qatar.

Religion

The majority of residents in Doha are Muslim. Catholics account for over 90% of the 150,000 Christian population in Doha. Following decrees by the Emir for the allocation of land to churches, the first Catholic church, Our Lady of the Rosary, was opened in Doha in March 2008. The church structure is discreet and Christian symbols are not displayed on the outside of the building. Several other churches exist in Doha, including the St.Isaac and St. George Greek Orthodox Church of Qatar, Doha, Qatar St.Isaac and St. George Greek Orthodox Church of Qatar the Syro-Malabar Church, Malankara Orthodox Church, Mar Thoma Church (affiliated with the Anglicans, but not part of the Communion), CSI Church, Syro-Malankara Church and a Pentecostal church. A majority of mosques are either Salafi or Sunni-oriented.

Administration

Districts

At the turn of the 20th century, Doha was divided into 9 main districts. In the 2010 census, there were more than 60 districts recorded in Doha Municipality. Some of the districts of Doha include:

Shortly after Qatar gained independence, many of the districts of old Doha including Al Najada, Al Asmakh and Old Al Hitmi faced gradual decline and as a result, much of their historical architecture has been demolished. Instead, the government shifted their focus toward the Doha Bay area, which housed districts such as Al Dafna and West Bay.

Economy

Doha is the economic center of Qatar. The city is the headquarters of numerous domestic and international organizations, including the country's largest oil and gas companies, QatarEnergy and Qatargas. Doha's economy is built primarily on the revenue the country has made from its oil and natural gas industries. Doha was included in Fortune's 15 best new cities for business in 2011.

Beginning in the late 20th century, the government launched numerous initiatives to diversify the country's economy in order to decrease its dependence on oil and gas resources. Doha International Airport was constructed in a bid to solidify the city's diversification into the tourism industry. This was replaced by Hamad International Airport in 2014. The new airport is almost twice the size of the former and features two of the longest runways in the world. Thirty-nine new hotels were under construction in the city in 2011.

As a result of Doha's rapid population boom and increased housing demands, real estate prices rose significantly through 2014. Real estate prices experienced a further spike after Qatar won the rights to host the 2022 FIFA World Cup. Al Asmakh, a Qatari real estate firm, released a report in 2014 which revealed substantial increases in real estate prices following a peak in 2008. Prices increased 5 to 10% in the first quarter of 2014 from the end of 2013. A 2015 study conducted by Numbeo, a crowd-sourced database, named Doha as the 10th most expensive city to live in globally. This rate of growth led to the development of planned communities in and around the city. Although the fall in oil prices since 2014 and a diplomatic crisis with Qatar's neighbors slowed growth in the city's population, government spending was increased to maintain the growth in real estate in metropolitan Doha.

Expatriate workers remitted $60bn between 2006 and 2012, with 54 percent of the workers' remittances of $60bn routed to Asian countries, followed by Arab nations that accounted for nearly half that volume (28 percent). India was the top destination of the remittances, followed by the Philippines, while the US, Egypt and the neighbouring UAE followed. Remittances in 2014 totaled $11.2 billion, amounting to 5.3% of Qatar's GDP.

Infrastructure

Architecture
Many of the older structures (1960–1970s) in the Old Doha districts have been demolished to make space for new buildings. A number of schemes have been taken to preserve the city's cultural and architectural heritage, such as the Qatar Museums Authority's 'Al Turath al Hai' ('living heritage') initiative. Katara Cultural Village is a model village in Doha launched by Sheikha Moza bint Nasser under Qatar Foundation to preserve the cultural identity of the country.

In 2011, more than 50 towers were under construction in Doha, the largest of which was the Doha Convention Center Tower. Constructions were suspended in 2012 following concerns that the tower would impede flight traffic and the site is being redeveloped into a park.

In 2014, Abdullah Al Attiyah, a senior government official, announced that Qatar would be spending $65bn on new infrastructure projects in upcoming years in preparation for the 2022 World Cup as well as progressing towards its objectives set out in the Qatar National Vision 2030.

Msheireb Downtown Doha, a 31 hectares development costing an estimated $5bn, was dubbed the largest inner city redevelopment of its kind when launched. Comprises several quarters opened over different phases, Msheireb aims to preserve and enhance the historic downtown area.

Atmosphere
Due to excessive heat from the sun during the summer, some Doha-based building companies have implemented various forms of cooling technology to alleviate the extremely torrid climatic conditions. This can include creating optical phenomena such as shadows, as well as more expensive techniques like ventilation, coolants, refrigerants, cryogenics, and dehumidifiers. Discussions regarding temperature control have also been features of various scheduled events involving large crowds. There are other initiatives that attempt to counter the heat by altering working hours, weather alteration methods such as cloud seeding, and using whiter and brighter construction materials to increase the albedo effects. Nonetheless, despite these measures, Doha and other areas of Qatar could become uninhabitable for humans due to climate change by the end of the 21st century.

Planned communities
One of the largest projects underway in Qatar is Lusail City, a planned community north of Doha which is estimated to be completed by 2020 at a cost of approximately $45bn. It is designed to accommodate 450,000 people. Al Waab City, another planned community under development, is estimated to cost QR15 bn. In addition to housing 8,000 individuals, it will also have shopping malls, educational, and medical facilities. Gewan Island is the latest development of UDC comprising a 400,000 sqm mixed use development.

Transportation

To support the expanding city and increasing numbers of residents and commuters, Qatar has heavily invested in upgrading the infrastructure of Doha and Qatar. Since 2004, Doha has been undergoing a huge expansion to its transportation network, including the addition of new highways, a new airport in 2014, a new seaport in 2016, and an 85 km metro system which went operational in 2019.

Roads

Several expressway projects were delivered by ASHGHAL or the Public Works Authority, including Industrial Area Road, Doha Expressway, Dukhan Highway Central, North Road, Al Sheehaniya Leatooriya Lijmiliya Road, F-Ring Road, and Salwa Road Phase 2. Works include road widening, underpasses, interchanges, stormwater drainage systems, effluent networks, systems networks, and lighting to improve road travel use and improved safety for all road users.

The latest project, expected to be delivered in 2024 is the Sharq Crossing:

"The estimated $12bn Sharq Crossing undertaking will involve three extensions interconnected by subsea tunnels. As per the original design, the intersection will incorporate three scaffolds spreading over between 600 meters and 1,310 meters, connecting Doha’s Hamad International Airport with the city’s social locale of Katara Cultural Village in the north and the focal business territory of West Bay."

Rail
A third of the Doha Metro is currently fully operational. It consists of four lines: the Red Line, the Gold Line, the Blue Line, and the Green Line. The Blue Line is expected to be completed in the second phase in 2025. Msheireb Station is the transfer station for all of the metro lines.

The Red Line (also known as Coast Line) will extend through Doha, running from Al Khor to Al Wakrah and Hamad Airport via the Red Line North and Red Line South. Doha Metro's Green Line, or Education Line, connects Doha to Education City and Al Riffa. Starting in Old Airport, the Gold Line (also known as Historic Line) will end in Al Rayyan and cover a distance of 30.6 km. Lastly, the Blue Line, or City Line, will only cover the inner city of Doha, and is planned to be semi-circular with a length of 17.5 km.

Air
Doha is served by Hamad International Airport which is Qatar's principal international gateway. The airport opened in 2014, replacing Doha International Airport.
The airport is named after the previous Emir of Qatar, Hamad bin Khalifa Al Thani. Hamad International Airport became the first Middle Eastern airport to be awarded the Skytrax's World Best Airport for 2021 in the 2021 World Airport Awards, ending the 7-year dominance of Singapore's Changi Airport. Qatar’s Hamad International Airport has been named the World’s Best Airport for the second year running. The announcement took place at the Skytrax 2022 World Airport Awards, held at Passenger Terminal EXPO in Paris, France.

Education

Doha is the educational center of the country and contains the highest preponderance of schools and colleges. In 1952, the first formal boys' school was opened in Doha. This was proceeded by the opening of the first formal girls' school three years later. The first university in the state, Qatar University, was opened in 1973. It provided separate faculties for men and women.

Education City, a  education complex launched by non-profit organization Qatar Foundation, began construction in 2000. It houses eight universities, the country's top high school, and offices for Al Jazeera's children television channel. It is geographically located in Al Rayyan municipality's Al Luqta, Al Gharrafa, Gharrafat Al Rayyan and Al Shagub districts, but falls under the umbrella of Metropolitan Doha.

In 2009, the government launched the World Innovation Summit for Education (WISE), a global forum that brings together education stakeholders, opinion leaders and decision makers from all over the world to discuss educational issues. The first edition was held in Doha in November 2009.

Some of the universities in Doha include:

Sports

Football

Football is the most popular sport in Doha. There are six Doha-based sports clubs with football teams competing in the Qatar Stars League, the country's top football league. They are Al Ahli, Al Arabi, Al Sadd, Al-Duhail and Qatar SC. Al Sadd, Al Arabi and Qatar SC are the three most successful teams in the league's history.

Numerous football tournaments have been hosted in Doha. The most prestigious tournaments include the 1988 and 2011 editions of the AFC Asian Cup and the 1995 FIFA World Youth Championship.

In December 2010, Qatar won the rights to host the 2022 FIFA World Cup. Three of the nine newly announced stadiums will be constructed in Doha, including Sports City Stadium, Doha Port Stadium, and Qatar University Stadium. Additionally, the Khalifa International Stadium is set to undergo an expansion.

Considering the country's rapid development for the 2022 World Cup, FIFA awarded the hosting rights of 2019 FIFA Club World Cup and 2020 FIFA Club World Cup also to Qatar.

Basketball
Doha was the host of the official 2005 FIBA Asia Championship, where Qatar's national basketball team finished 3rd, its best performance to date, and subsequently qualified for the Basketball World Cup.

The majority of the teams that make up the official Qatari Basketball League are based in Doha.

Volleyball
Doha four times was the host of the official FIVB Volleyball Men's Club World Championship and three times host FIVB Volleyball Women's Club World Championship. Doha also hosted the Asian Volleyball Championship.

Other sports

In 2001, Qatar became the first country in the Middle East to hold a women's tennis tournament with the inauguration of its Qatar Ladies Open tournament. Doha also hosts International Tennis Federation (ITF) ladies tournaments. Since 2008, the Sony Ericsson Championships (equivalent to the ATP's season-ending Championships) has taken place in Doha, in the Khalifa International Tennis Complex, and features record prize money of $4.45 million, including a check of $1,485,000 for the winner, which represents the largest single guaranteed payout in women's tennis.

Doha hosted the 15th Asian Games, held in December 2006, spending a total of $2.8 billion for its preparation. The city also hosted the 3rd West Asian Games in December 2005. Doha was expected to host the 2011 Asian Indoor Games; but the Qatar Olympic Committee cancelled the event.

The city submitted a bid for the 2016 Olympics. On June 4, 2008, the city was eliminated from the shortlist for the 2016 Olympic Games. On August 26, 2011 it was confirmed that Doha would bid for the 2020 Summer Olympics. Doha however failed to become a Candidate City for the 2020 Games.

The MotoGP motorcycling grand prix of Doha is held annually at Losail International Circuit, located just outside the city boundaries. The city is also the location of the Grand Prix of Qatar for the F1 Powerboat World Championship, annually hosting a round in Doha Bay. Beginning in November 2009, Doha has been host of The Oryx Cup World Championship, a hydroplane boat race in the H1 Unlimited season. The races take place in Doha Bay.

In April 2012 Doha was awarded both the 2014 FINA World Swimming Championships and the 2012 World Squash Championships. The fourth World Mindsports Championships took place in Doha from August 19 to August 27, 2017 with the participation of more than 1,000 competitors.

In 2014, Qatar was selected as the host of the 2019 World Athletics Championships, which is the seventeenth edition of the IAAF World Athletics Championships. Doha won the bid to host the event over Barcelona and Eugene.

In 2020, Doha hosted the Qatar ExxonMobil Open, which received the Tournament of the Year award in the 250 category from the 2019 ATP Awards. The tournament won the award for the third time in five years.

Doha will host the 2030 Asian Games.

Stadiums and sport complexes
 
Aspire Academy was launched in 2004 with the aim of creating world-class athletes.  It is situated in the Doha Sports City Complex, which also accommodates the Khalifa International Stadium, the Hamad Aquatic Centre, the Aspire Tower and the Aspire Dome. The latter has hosted more than 50 sporting events since its inception, including some events during the 2006 Asian Games. Aspire Academy, a sporting academy for youth, is located in the center of Aspire Zone.

Sporting venues in Doha and its suburbs include:

Culture

Doha was chosen as the Arab Capital of Culture in 2010. Cultural weeks organized by the Ministry of Culture, which featured both Arab and non-Arab cultures, were held in Doha from April to June to celebrate the city's selection.

Arts

The Museum of Islamic Art or MIA in Doha, opened in 2008, is regarded as one of the best museums in the region. This, and several other Qatari museums located in the city, like the Arab Museum of Modern Art, falls under the Qatar Museums Authority (QMA) which is led by Sheikha Al-Mayassa bint Hamad bin Khalifa Al-Thani, the sister of the emir of Qatar.

The National Museum of Qatar, which was constructed in place of the original Qatar National Museum, opened to the public on 28 March 2019.

Cinema 

The Doha Film Institute (DFI) is an organisation established in 2010 to oversee film initiatives and create a sustainable film industry in Qatar. DFI was founded by H.E. Sheikha Al Mayassa bint Hamad bin Khalifa Al-Thani.

The Doha Tribeca Film Festival (DTFF), partnered with the American-based Tribeca Film Festival, was held annually in Doha from 2009 to 2012.

Media 

Qatar's first radio station, Mosque Radio, began broadcasting in the 1960s from Doha. The multinational media conglomerate Al Jazeera Media Network is based in Doha with its wide variety of channels of which Al Jazeera Arabic, Al Jazeera English, Al Jazeera Documentary Channel, Al Jazeera Mubasher, beIN Sports Arabia and other operations are based in the TV Roundabout in the city. Al-Kass Sports Channel's headquarters is also located in Doha.

Theatre 

Theatre was introduced to Qatar in the mid-20th century. Theatrical performances are held at Qatar National Theater and at the Qatar National Convention Center in Doha.

Library 

Despite the change in technology and internet, libraries in Qatar are still one of its treasures that are preserved and maintained for the public use. Qatar National Library (QNL) is a modern facility that provides the people of Qatar with access to over one million books.

International relations
Twin and sister cites of Doha are (as per agreements):

Tunis, Tunisia (since 1994)
Alameda, California (since 2004)
Port Louis, Mauritius (since 2007)
Beijing, China (since 2008)
Beit Sahour, Palestine (since 2009)
Banjul, Gambia (since 2011)
Algiers, Algeria (since 2013)

Sarajevo, Bosnia and Herzegovina (since 2018)
Brasília, Brazil (since 2014)
Sofia, Bulgaria (since 2012)

San Salvador, El Salvador (since 2018)

Tbilisi, Georgia (since 2012)
Astana, Kazakhstan (since 2011)
Bishkek, Kyrgyzstan (since 2018)

Mogadishu, Somalia (since 2014)
Ankara, Turkey (since 2016)
Los Angeles, California, United States (since 2016)(Despite being acknowledged as an agreement, no mention of it in the official Los Angeles website as the sister city.)
Miami, Florida, United States (since 2016)
Libertador, Venezuela (since 2015)
Charleston, South Carolina, United States(2019)
Yerevan, Armenia (since 2022)

Gallery

See also
 Timeline of Doha
 Doha Declaration
 Doha Development Round of World Trade Organization (WTO) talks
 Qatar National Day, which is held in Doha every year on December 18

References

External links

 Projects in Doha and Major Construction and Architectural Developments
 Information and History of Doha

 
1825 establishments in Asia
Burial sites of the House of Thani
Capitals in Asia
Municipalities of Qatar
Populated coastal places in Qatar
Populated places established in 1825
Populated places in Qatar